Lost Empire is the second in a series of adventure novels by Clive Cussler, co-authored by Grant Blackwood, whose main characters  are adventurers and treasure hunters Sam Fargo and his wife, Remi.  The book's hardcover edition was first published August 31, 2010.  Other editions of this novel were released on various dates in 2010-11.

Plot
While vacationing and scuba diving near Zanzibar, the Fargos discover a ship's bell that they soon determine belonged to the Confederate warship Shenandoah, which after the Civil War had been sold to the Sultan of Zanzibar before mysteriously disappearing.  As soon as they raise the bell, they find someone else wants it badly enough to kill to obtain it.  They lose the bell to their pursuers, who they discover are involved with the new government of Mexico and they discover a number of tourists who discovered items of interest to the pursuers ended up dead.  The Fargos end up traveling to the mainland of Tanzania, the rainforests of Madagascar and to the site of the 1883 Krakatoa volcano explosion in Indonesia in their quest to find answers to the intrigue.  They not only get the bell back, but they discover what happened to the Shenandoah and make a stunning archaeological discovery.

Co-author Clive Cussler has a habit of making cameo appearances in many of his novels.  In this one his appearance is a bit more pronounced than normal, when he helps the Fargos escape from a group of robbers who captured them.

References

2010 American novels
Fargo Adventures
G. P. Putnam's Sons books
Collaborative novels
Michael Joseph books